Nikhil Kumar (born June 8, 2004) is an American chess international master. As of January 2022, he is rated 2340 ELO. His peak rating was 2479. He is ranked seventeenth for under 21 year olds in the United States. He was also the under 12 World Youth Chess Championship in 2016.

He was born in South Bend, Indiana, and grew up in Miami, Florida. He began playing chess at three years old with his father, and quickly rose to chess stardom as one of the best youth chess players of the United States. He is a member of the US National Chess team and has been a member for the past 6 years.

In 2016, at the U12 World Chess Championship he beat grandmaster Rameshbabu Praggnanandhaa to become the world champion.

He is currently a student at University of Pennsylvania. He was the salutatorian at Ransom Everglades School in Coconut Grove, FL. He was the president of the Ransom Everglades Chess Team and created micronations in his free time.

References

External links
 
 

American chess players
World Youth Chess Champions

2004 births
Living people